Ambulyx kuangtungensis is a species of moth of the family Sphingidae first described by Rudolf Mell in 1922.

Distribution 
It is known from southern China, northern Thailand, northern Vietnam and Taiwan.

Description 
The wingspan is 65–80 mm.

Biology 
The larvae have been recorded feeding on Choerospondias axillaris in Guangdong.

References

Ambulyx
Moths described in 1922
Moths of Asia